The electoral district of Jika Jika was an electoral district of the Legislative Assembly in the Australian state of Victoria.

The district was defined by the Electoral Districts Boundaries Act 1903:

The district was abolished in a redistribution in 1927, replaced by the electoral district of Northcote.

Members for Jika Jika

Election results

References

Former electoral districts of Victoria (Australia)
1904 establishments in Australia
1927 disestablishments in Australia